I Am Dragon may refer to

He's a Dragon, a 2015 Russian fantasy movie also released in English as I Am Dragon
I Am Dragon, a 2015 EP by Swedish singer-songwriter Miriam Bryant